1972–1975 Bangladesh insurgency refers to the period after the independence of Bangladesh when left-wing Communist insurgents, particularly the Gonobahini fought against the government of the Prime Minister Sheikh Mujibur Rahman.

The government responded by forming the Jatiya Rakkhi Bahini, which began a crackdown on the general populace. The force became involved in the numerous charges of human rights abuse including political killings, shooting by death squads, and large number of rapes on womans.

Background
In 1972, Jatiyo Samajtantrik Dal was formed when it split from Bangladesh Chhatra League, the student wing of the Bangladesh Awami League, under the leadership of Serajul Alam Khan, M. A. Jalil, ASM Abdur Rab and Shahjahan Siraj. Its armed wing, Gonobahini, led by Colonel Abu Taher and Hasanul Haq Inu, began an armed campaign against the government of Sheikh Mujibur Rahman in order to establish scientific socialism and a Marxist state.

Political killings
Anthony Mascarenhas states that by the end of 1973, the number of politically motivated murders in Bangladesh after independence was over 2000. The victims included some members of parliament and many of the murders were resulted of intra-party conflicts within the Awami League. The Gonobahini also killed numerous Bangladesh Chhatra League and Awami League members.

On the other hand, Maoists such as Siraj Sikder of the Purba Banglar Sarbahara Party and Abdul Haq began attacking the government and people whom they considered "class enemies".

The government responded by forming the Jatiya Rakkhi Bahini. Anthony Mascarenhas claimed that within three years, deaths of mostly Jatiyo Samajtantrik Dal members reached 30,000, all of which were killed by the Jatiya Rakkhi Bahini.

End of insurgency
After being de facto ruler of the nation, Ziaur Rahman realized that the disorder set off by the soldiers' mutiny had to be suppressed firmly if discipline was to be restored in the army. Ziaur Rahman declared martial law, cracked down on the Jatiyo Samajtantrik Dal, Abu Taher was sentenced to death and other party figures had various terms of imprisonment slapped on them.

Legacy
Human Rights Watch states that institutionalized violence committed by the Jatiya Rakkhi Bahini during the insurgency, established the culture of impunity and widespread prevalence of abuses by security forces in independent Bangladesh.

References

20th-century conflicts
Communism in Bangladesh
Rebellions in Asia
Cold War rebellions
1970s in Bangladesh
Conflicts in 1972
Conflicts in 1973
Conflicts in 1974
Conflicts in 1975
1972 in Bangladesh
1973 in Bangladesh
1974 in Bangladesh
1975 in Bangladesh
Communism-based civil wars
Communist rebellions